XC may refer to:

Businesses and organizations
 CrossCountry, a British train operator (rail code XC, for XC Trains Ltd.)
 Xavier College, a school in Melbourne, Australia
 Corendon Airlines (IATA airline code XC since 2005)
 KD Air, a charter airline in Canada (IATA airline code XC, 1990-2019)

Science and technology
 XC (programming language), a concurrent programming language developed by XMOS
 Capacitive reactance or XC, a property of a capacitor
 Exact cover problem, in theoretical computer science
 Xerox copy or carbon copy, in correspondence
 Xylene cyanol, a color marker used in gel electrophoresis
 Wills Wing XC, an American hang glider design
 XC, a model of the Australian Ford Falcon automobile

Sport
 Cross-country running
 Cross-country skiing
 Cross-country cycling
 Cross-country equestrianism
 Cross-country gliding

Other uses
 90 (number), in Roman numerals
 Christogram, a symbol for Christf
 Xeno-canto, a website for shared CC-licensed bird sound
 Xenoblade Chronicles, a series of video games developed by Monolith Soft
 XC Aircraft Registration Prefix for Mexican Government Aircraft

See also
 10C (disambiguation)